The Punjab Prisons is a correctional organization, a uniformed service and an attached department of the provincial Home Department in Punjab, Pakistan. The organization works under administrative control of the Additional Chief Secretary Home to Government of the Punjab, Pakistan. Functional head of the organization is Inspector General of Prisons who manages 43 prisons in the province. The organization is responsible for custody, control, care and correction (4 Cs) of prisoners confined in various central, district and special jails in the province of Punjab, Pakistan).

History
The Punjab Prisons Department was established in 1854 for custody, control, care and correction (4 Cs) of prisoners confined in various central, district and special jails in the province of Punjab and Dr. C. Hathaway was appointed as first Inspector General (IG). The Prisons Act of 1894 (Act No.IX of 1894) was passed by the Governor-General of India in Council which received the assent of the Governor General on 22 March 1894. The District Jail Sialkot (Since 1865), District Jail Shahpur District Sargodha (Since 1873), District Jail Jhelum (Since 1854), District Jail Rajanpur (Since 1860), Borstal Institution & Juvenile Jail Bahawalpur (Since 1882), District Jail Multan (Since 1872), District Jail Faisalabad (Since 1873) and Central Jail Gujranwala (Since 1854) in Punjab province and District Jail (now Juvenile Jail) Dadu (Since 1774) in Sindh province were even functional long before passing of the Prisons Act in 1894. At the time of independence, the Punjab inherited nineteen jails whereas Twenty-one more jails have so far been commissioned in the province after independence. Presently there are Forty Jails functional in the Province including One High Security Prison, Nine Central Jails, Twenty-five District Jails, Two Borstal Institutions & Juvenile Jails, One Women Jail and Two Sub Jails.

Legal framework 
The management and superintendence of prisons and all other matters relating to the prisoners are generally regulated under the following laws / rules:

Acts (1894 to 2006)

 The Prisons Act, 1894
 The Prisoners' Act, 1900
 Lunacy Act, 1912
 The Punjab Borstal Act, 1926
 Good Conduct Prisoners Probation Release Act, 1926
 Punjab Employees Efficiency, Discipline and Accountability Act, (PEEDA) 2006

Rules and Regulations (1818 to 2010)

 Regulation III of 1818 (A Regulation for the Confinement of State Prisoners)
 Good Conduct Prisoner's Probation Release Rules, 1927
 West Pakistan Prisons Department Delegation of Power Rules, 1962
 The Pakistan Prisons Rules, 1978
 The Punjab Execution of the Punishment of Whipping Rules, 1979
 Juvenile Justice System Rules, 2001
 Punjab Juvenile Justice System Rules, 2002
 Punjab Prisons Department Service Rules, 2010
 Parole System in Pakistan

Ordinances

 Probation of Offenders Ordinance (XLV of 1960)
 West Pakistan Maintenance of Public Order Ordinance (XXXI of 1960)
 Execution of the Punishment of Whipping Ordinance (IX of 1979)
 Juvenile Justice System Ordinance (XXII of 2000)
 Mental Health Ordinance 2001

Other relevant laws
Besides above statutes, the following laws are relevant to the administration of prisons, prisoners and jail staffers.

 Pakistan Penal Code.
 Criminal Procedure Code.
 Civil Procedure Code.
 Punjab Removal from Service Ordinance, 2000.
 Punjab Employees Efficiency Discipline and Accountability Act, 2006.
 Punjab Civil Service Rules, 1974.
 West Pakistan Prisons Department Delegation of Power Rules, 1962.
 Punjab Prisons Department Executive Staff Punishment and Appeal Rules, 1981 (promulgated on 8 January 1981).
 Punjab Prisons Department Service Rules, 2010.

Inspector Generals since 1894 

Following table shows the up-to-date names and tenure of posting of Inspector General of Prisons, Punjab, Pakistan since 1854.

BPS-21 officer

Mr. Farooq Nazeer, ex-IG Prisons (BPS-21) is the one and only BPS-21 officer of the Punjab Prisons Service at present. Particulars of the said officer are given in the following table.

DIGs of Prisons
Following table shows the names, district of domicile, dates of birth, dates of joining, BPS, present postings and dates of superannuation of the serving DIGs in the Punjab Prisons (Pakistan).

DIG Prisons(OPS)

Following table shows the names, district of domicile, dates of birth, dates of joining, BPS, present postings and dates of superannuation of the serving [[DIG Prisons(OPS)|] in Punjab Prisons (Pakistan).

AIG Prisons/Superintendents of Jails

Following table shows the names, district of domicile, dates of birth, dates of joining, BPS, present postings and dates of superannuation of the serving Superintendents of Jails in Punjab Prisons (Pakistan)according to the seniority list

Uniforms

Before 1981, the prison officers in all provinces of Pakistan used to wear khaki colour uniforms as worn by the Pakistan Army. During the regime of Chief Martial Law Administrator, General Muhammad Zia-ul-Haq, some army officers objected to the wearing of army-type uniforms by the officials of Forest Department, Prisons Department, Karachi Port Trust, Sea Customs, Land Customs, Excise & Taxation, Pakistan International Airlines (PIA), Police Qaumi Razakars, Airport Security Force (ASF), Merchant Navy /Marine Academy, Sergent and Deputy Sergent-at-Arms of the National Assembly and Senate Secretariats, Boy Scouts and Girl Guides in Pakistan. It was suggested that the police type uniforms should be prescribed for the officers and men of the Prisons Department. Thus, a meeting was held in the Federal Ministry of Interior, Islamabad, and the pattern of uniform for prison officials was changed from military to that of police. Following specific orders were passed by Government of Pakistan, Ministry of Interior in respect of Prisons Department:

It is worth-mentioning that the post of IG Prisons had been a BPS-20 post in 1981 i.e. equivalent to the post of DIG Police (BPS-20). Accordingly, Government of Pakistan, Ministry of Interior had directed that the badges of rank of the IG Prisons should be as worn by the DIG Police.

Up-gradation of pay scales, sanction of uniform allowance, badges of ranks, etc.
On 2 May 2009, Chief Justice of Pakistan, Mr. Justice Iftikhar Muhammad Chaudhry visited Central Jail Lahore. On 21 September 2009, on the eve of Eid-ul-Fitr, the Chief Justice visited Central Jail Rawalpindi. Besides passing various orders respecting management of prisons and prisoners during the said visits of jails, he issued verbal directions to the concerned authorities of Punjab Government for upgrading the pay scales of the prison officers in the Punjab and for doubling of their pay. Later, Khawaja Muhammad Sharif, Chief Justice, Lahore High Court, Lahore took suo moto notice of the case and issued directions to the provincial Government for the upgrading of posts of incumbents of the prisons department to make them at par with the equivalent ranks of Police. On 26 September 2009, Government of the Punjab, Home Department, Lahore issued notification through which the Pay Scales of Prison Officers in Punjab were made equivalent to the Punjab Police for all ranks and Uniform Allowance was also sanctioned for IG Prisons, DIG Prisons, and other ranks of the Punjab Prisons. After such up-gradation, officers of the Prisons Department in Punjab started wearing uniforms equivalent to their counterparts in the Police Department, in accordance with the spirit of the Government of Pakistan, Ministry of Interior's letter No.4/2/78-Public dated 28 July 1981, Government of the Punjab, Home Department, Lahore's letter No.PRS-I(6)7/76-Vol-III dated 10 August 1981 addressed to the Inspector General of Prisons, Punjab, Lahore, Syed Shafqat Ullah Shah, Inspector General of Prisons, Punjab, Lahore's letter No.EB/U.2.I/29847-74 dated 19 August 1981 captioned "UNIFORM"  addressed to the Superintendents of all jails in the Punjab as well as Pakistan Prison Rules 1978, Chapter No.48 - Uniforms, pending such specific notification by the provincial government. Inspector General of Prisons, Punjab has moved a summary to Chief Minister Punjab through Additional Chief Secretary (Home) for replacement of the existing Rule 1204 in accordance with the table below, and repealing the Rules 1205 and 1206 of Pakistan Prison Rules 1978.

Administrative regions
The jails in the province of Punjab were grouped into four circles for the purpose of the appointment, promotion and transfer of warders and for better organization. In 2004, these circles were replaced with regions with independent regional offices (detached from Headquarter Jails). At present, prisons regions have been established at Lahore, Multan, Rawalpindi, Faisalabad, Sahiwal, Bahawalpur and Sargodha. Case for establishment of two more regions at Gujranwala and Dera Ghazi Khan has also been initiated.

List of jails

The following table shows detailed list, as it stood on 30 July 2018, of all 43 jails in the province of Punjab, Pakistan.

Punjab Prisons officers /officials and their relatives killed during service 

Following table shows list of Punjab Prisons Officers /officials and their relatives killed during service.

Female convicts executed since 1947 

Following table shows list of female condemned prisoners sentenced to death and finally hanged in various jails of Punjab (Pakistan) since 1947.

See also

 Prisons in Pakistan
 Government of Punjab, Pakistan
 Punjab Police (Pakistan)
 Prison Officer
 Headquarter Jail
 National Academy for Prisons Administration

References

Provincial law enforcement agencies of Pakistan
Prisons in Pakistan
Prison and correctional agencies
Government agencies of Punjab, Pakistan